The Mitre line is an Argentine broad gauge commuter rail service in Buenos Aires Province and is part of the Ferrocarril General Bartolomé Mitre division. The service is currently operated by the State-owned company Operadora Ferroviaria Sociedad del Estado after the Government of Argentina rescinded its contract with Corredores Ferroviarios in March 2015.

History

Background

The first line was built and operated by the Buenos Aires Northern Railway, a British-owned company that ran trains from Central Station (then from Retiro) to Tigre, joining both cities in 1857. The company was then taken over by the Central Argentine Railway in 1888 due to financial problems.

In 1891, Victoria station was inaugurated. Trains to Zelaya and Capilla del Señor departed from Victoria for the first time one year later. In 1916, the Retiro-Tigre line was electrified, becoming the first electrified railway system in South America. New British Thomson-Houston (BTH) multiple units were acquired to run on the line. The CAR also installed the first crossbuck and manually-operated gates on the many existing level crossings.

During successive years, several new stations were built by the company, including Beccar (1913), La Lucila (1933), Acassuso (1934) and Virreyes (1938).

Ferrocarriles Argentinos

When the Government of Argentina led by Juan Perón nationalised British and French railway companies in 1948, the state-owned company Ferrocarriles Argentinos took over all the railway lines in the country.

In 1962, the FIAT 7131, a railcar manufactured by FIAT Concord, made its debut in the Villa Ballester-Zárate and Victoria-Capilla del Señor sections of Ferrocarril Mitre, then managed by Ferrocarriles Argentinos (FA). These light railcars replaced Ganz Works railcars that had run on those lines since 1938.

The lack of maintenance of the FIAT 7131 coaches meant that some of them went out of service, so in 1987 Ferrocarriles Argentinos acquired new light railcars for the Zárate and Capilla del Señor branches. The company bought 8 units made by Materfer which were soon nicknamed Pitufos (a Spanish translation for "Smurfs" due to their small size). Nevertheless, the limited seating capacity and poor damping of those units mean that the 7131 coaches continued to be used.

Privatisation: TBA

FA operated the trains until 1991 when FEMESA temporarily took over all the urban services prior to the services being privatised. After the Government of Carlos Menem privatised the urban railways services private company Trenes de Buenos Aires (TBA) took over the Mitre Line.

When the Government of Argentina decided to privative all the urban railway services in 1992, the Mitre Line was given the concession for TBA (which also took over Sarmiento Line) through Decree N° 730/95.

During the first two years of the concession, TBA met the requirements specified in the contract regarding the frequency of service, with an average of 98%. By February 1999 the consortium had invested US$200 million including the reconstruction of 220 Toshiba wagons, and the remodelling of 13 stations and workshops. In addition, a new ticket selling system was introduced with the installation of vending machines.

One of the most notable improvements was the introduction of "Puma" coaches on the Retiro-Tigre branch. These coaches were built by local factory Emprendimientos Ferroviarios S.A. (EMFER) and featured air conditioning, ABS brakes and computer-supervising systems.

In 1997 the Government decided to modify the contracts of concession with a plan of modernisation worth US$2.5 billion. The future investments included acquiring 492 brand-new electric multiple units, the refurbishing of more than 100 km of existing tracks, and the installation of new signalling, among other improvements.

Nevertheless, the Government of Fernando De la Rúa (which had come to power in 1999) made changes to the original project, reducing the amount of the budget to US$1.3 billion. The State granted subsidies to TBA (and the rest of the private operators) as a way to compensate for the losses arising from the change in plans and to avoid fare increases.

Due to the lack of investment in the Mitre Line, the quality of the service decreased considerably. TBA operated the line until the 2012 Once station rail disaster happened. As a result, the National Government revoked the concession granted to TBA and gave the Mitre and Sarmiento lines to the State operator UGOMS, that then ran the lines until 2014 when it was transferred under concession to Corredores Ferroviarios.

New concession

On 12 February 2014, the Government of Argentina granted the operation of the line to the private company Corredores Ferroviarios. That same year the Government announced the acquisition of new coaches to increase the Mitre Line's rolling stock. The coaches were manufactured by the Chinese company CSR Corporation Limited, with the first coaches arriving in June 2014.

In November 2014, the Retiro-Tigre section of Mitre Line renewed its fleet of electric trains, adding a total of 12 brand new trains for that service. The CSR trains replaced the old Toshiba cars that had been brought to Argentina in the 1960s for the Mitre and Sarmiento lines. The purchase cost $250 million was paid by the National Government.

The branch line to José L. Suárez's fleet was renewed completely with the same Chinese trains in January 2015.

Renationalisation
State-owned company Operadora Ferroviaria Sociedad del Estado took over the Mitre line (operated by Corredores Ferroviarios) on 2 March 2015 after the Government of Argentina rescinded the contracts that had been signed with the company. The contract terms specified that the concession could be cancelled with no right to claim compensation. The agreements had been signed in February 2014 and had committed Argentren and Corredores Ferroviarios to operate the lines.

Current works
In 2017, the Ministry of Transport announced the construction of a viaduct for the Retiro–Tigre branch of Mitre Line in Buenso Aires. The viaduct would extend from Dorrego Avenue in Palermo to Congreso Avenue in Núñez for 3.9 kilometres. Works began in September 2017.  The project also included a total refurbishment of Lisandro de la Torre and Belgrano C stations. The viaduct was opened to traffic on 10 May 2019 by President Mauricio Macri leading to the removal eight level crossings.

Historic operators 

Companies that have operated the Sarmiento Line since it was established after the 1948 nationalisation are:

Train services
Mitre Line services as of February, 2015:

Gallery

See also 
 Mitre Railway
 Trenes Argentinos
 Corredores Ferroviarios

Notes

References

External links

 
 Tren Mitre on Trenes Argentinos.net
 Tren Mitre.link 
 Tren Mitre.com.ar 

Greater Buenos Aires
m
5 ft 6 in gauge railways in Argentina
Articles containing video clips